The 2022 USL League One season was the fourth season of USL League One. The regular season began on April 2 and ended on October 15. The playoffs began on October 22 and ended on November 6.

Eleven teams participated in the 2022 season, one fewer than the previous season.  Four reserve teams operated by clubs in Major League Soccer that participated in the previous season (Fort Lauderdale CF, New England Revolution II, North Texas SC and Toronto FC II) began play in MLS's new developmental league, MLS Next Pro.  They were replaced by expansion franchises Central Valley Fuego FC and Northern Colorado Hailstorm FC, and by Charlotte Independence, who decided to move from USL Championship to USL League One. At the conclusion of the season, FC Tucson announced they were leaving League One and returning to USL League Two as a result of restructuring of their ownership group.

Richmond Kickers won the regular season title, but were defeated by Chattanooga Red Wolves in the playoff semifinal. Tormenta FC then defeated Chattanooga in the 2022 final, winning their first championship.

Teams

Managerial changes

League table

Results table

Playoffs 
The 2022 USL League One Playoffs (branded as the 2022 USL League One Playoffs presented by Hisense USA for sponsorship reasons) will be the post-season championship of the USL League One season.

Bracket

Schedule

Quarter-finals

Semi-finals

USL League One Final 

Championship Game MVP: Kazaiah Sterling (Tormenta FC)

Average home attendances 
Ranked from highest to lowest average attendance.

Sources: USL, Soccer Stadium Digest, Mike Pendleton

Regular season statistical leaders

Top scorers

Hat-tricks 

Notes
(H) – Home team(A) – Away team

Top assists

Clean sheets

Individual awards

All-league teams

Monthly awards

Weekly awards

See also 
 USL League One
 2022 USL Championship season
 2022 USL League Two season

Notes

References

External links 
 USL League One official website

 
2022
2022 in American soccer leagues